Empress Augusta Bay is a bay on the western side of the island of Bougainville Island, within the Autonomous Region of Bougainville in northeastern Papua New Guinea. 

It is a subsistence fishing area for the people of Bougainville.

History
Empress Augusta Bay is named after Augusta Viktoria of Schleswig-Holstein, wife of German Emperor William II.

In November 1943 the bay was the site of the Battle of Empress Augusta Bay, between Allied and Japanese forces. 

During the 1970s and 1980s the bay was seriously polluted by copper tailings from the world's largest copper mine, Panguna, operated by Rio Tinto Group. This issue contributed to the formation of the secessionist Bougainville Revolutionary Army and a civil war on the island between 1989 and 1997.

See also

Location coordinates — 

Bays of Papua New Guinea
Geography of the Autonomous Region of Bougainville